Daniel O'Connell (Jnr) (1816 – 14 June 1897) was one of seven children (the youngest of four sons) of Daniel and Mary O'Connell of Ireland. He served in the British Parliament from 1846 to 1847 as Member of Parliament (MP) for Dundalk, from 1847 to 1848 as an MP for Waterford City, and from 1853 to 1863 as MP for Tralee. He was also a moderately successful brewer, producing a brand called "O'Connell's Ale", which for a short time tried to compete with Guinness in popularity.
His brothers Maurice, John and Morgan were all MPs.

See also
 O'Connell of Derrynane

References
Bishop, Erin. 1999. My Darling Danny: Letters from Mary O'Connell to Her Son Daniel, 1830-1832. Cork University Press.

External links 
 
 

1816 births
1897 deaths
UK MPs 1841–1847
UK MPs 1847–1852
UK MPs 1852–1857
UK MPs 1857–1859
UK MPs 1859–1865
Daniel Jr.
Members of the Parliament of the United Kingdom for County Louth constituencies (1801–1922)
Members of the Parliament of the United Kingdom for County Waterford constituencies (1801–1922)
Members of the Parliament of the United Kingdom for County Kerry constituencies (1801–1922)
Irish Repeal Association MPs